Taller Torres Garcia (sometimes abbreviated TTG) was an organization founded by Joaquín Torres-García in Montevideo, Uruguay in 1943. He intended it to serve as a form of art education that would support young artists. The group organized exhibitions and published its own magazine. Its members included many prominent artists, such as Torres-García’s sons Augusto Torres and Horacio Torres, Julio Alpuy, José Gurvich, and Gonzalo Fonseca. The group built on the ideas of Torres-Garcia and were influential in advancing modern art in Uruguay. The group later dissolved in 1963.

References 

Arts organizations based in South America
Organizations based in Montevideo
1943 establishments in Uruguay
Arts organizations established in 1943
Uruguayan art
Organizations disestablished in 1963
1963 disestablishments in Uruguay